The Smoky Mountain Railroad was a standard gauge class-III shortline that operated from Knoxville, Tennessee, to Sevierville, Tennessee, from 1909 until 1961.

History
The railroad was established by Knoxville contractor William J. Oliver, and was originally named the Knoxville, Sevierville and Eastern Railway. It was incorporated on July 15, 1907, and construction started in 1908. The first segment was opened between Vestal in South Knoxville and Sevierville on December 20, 1909, bringing the line's total length to 27.8 miles. The line connected with the Southern Railway at Knoxville. In July 1921, the bank foreclosed on the railroad and later sold it for $50,000 to L.C. Gunter on November 1, 1921. The line was then re-organized as the Knoxville & Carolina Railroad Company. The railroad was sold again at auction for $50,000 on May 1, 1926, but since the new owner intended to disband the company and sell off the assets, the sale was delayed. It was eventually purchased by the Tennessee and North Carolina Railroad and re-named the Smoky Mountain Railroad.

At the end of 1937, the T&NC sold their shares of the Smoky Mountain Railroad to Midwest Steel, a company that dealt in scrap iron. On April 11, 1938, the owners of the railroad applied for abandonment but the application was denied. The railroad changed ownership numerous times over years, as the line was never profitable and struggled to stay afloat with as few as 300 carloads of freight being shipped out of Sevierville annually, a volume of freight so low as to preclude profitable freight operations.  The railroad's low speed (usually limited to 25 mph/40 kmph due to track conditions) made passenger service unprofitable once automobile ownership became widespread in the area, even though a custom self-propelled motorcar had been purchased in October 1922, for the then-huge sum of $16,000, and was used to make three daily runs between Sevierville and Knoxville.

World War II brought about the only notable period of profitability for the railroad, as the Tennessee Valley Authority initiated construction of Douglas Dam on the French Broad River a few miles north of Sevierville.  A branch line was constructed from Sevierville to the dam site, and the Smoky Mountain Railroad hauled in most of the equipment and materials needed to construct the dam.

Once the dam was complete the railroad began to struggle anew, and by 1946 the line was again losing large sums of money.  The stockholders of the railroad applied for abandonment in 1947, but the Interstate Commerce Commission denied the request. In 1951, passenger services ended. The railroad ended steam operations on December 9, 1954, with 1911 Baldwin 4-6-2 #110 (former Little River Railroad #110) pulling the last steam-powered train. This was due to the Southern Railway (on which the SMRR relied on for maintenance of their steam locomotives) ending all steam operations and subsequently dismantling their steam shops in Knoxville. The railroad then used a GE 44 ton diesel for motive power. The railroad continued to operate until January 16, 1961, when operations were suspended due to poor track conditions. In May 1964, the ICC finally approved a request for abandonment.

In 1966, the track was taken up. The railroad is now completely gone. Several of the Smoky Mountain Railroad's former locomotives are still in existence.  In 1961 steam locomotives #107, a 2-8-0; and #206, a 2-6-0; were sold to "Rebel Railroad", a narrow gauge tourist train line built at nearby Pigeon Forge for static display.  Rebel Railroad changed ownership over the years and is today part of the Dollywood theme park.  #107 is still displayed at the entrance to Dollywood, however #206 was sold to the "Chattanooga Choo-Choo Hotel" in Chattanooga, Tennessee, in the early 1970s.

4-6-2 #110, originally built for the Little River Railroad, is now at Coldwater, Michigan, operating on a tourist railroad.

Locomotives

Locomotives owned by the railroad

Locomotive Leased by the railroad.

References

Transportation in Sevier County, Tennessee
Transportation in Knox County, Tennessee
Defunct Tennessee railroads

External links
HawkinsRails' Smoky Mountain page
Taplines' Smoky Mountain history